Natalie Palamides (born January 6, 1990) is an American actress, comedian and writer.

Early life
As a young child living outside Pittsburgh, Palamides made comedic home videos in her backyard. She would do bits in the corridors at school. Disney productions and the Austin Powers movie series were early influences. Studying at the Indiana University of Pennsylvania, Palamides was inspired by the European clown tradition that her theater professor introduced her to. During college, Palamides performed group improvisation with the Pig Iron Theatre Company.

Career
Aspiring to work at Saturday Night Live, Palamides moved to Los Angeles and joined the Upright Citizens Brigade after college. She began voice-over and commercial work. She also took classes on clown performance at the Idiot Workshop and the Lyric Hyperion. Early sketches featured Palamides' characters: fantasizing about eating salad from a man's pants; complaining to the manager of sandwich shop Eggslut as an anthropomorphic egg; and insisting on being literally objectified. Through her classes, variety shows and open mic shows, she began developing longer-form performance from improvisations in unusual outfits.

With Dr. Brown from the Lyric, Palamides adapted her early egg character into an hour-long show, Laid.

Palamides developed the exaggeratedly masculine character Nate, from her work with the Pig Iron Theatre Company, into an hour-long performance, Nate – A One Man Show. Members of the audience participate, such as by wrestling Nate, with audience consent and sexual consent as themes. After winning the Total Theatre Award at the 2018 Edinburgh Fringe Festival, it was commissioned by Amy Poehler's production company Paper Kite and released on Netflix on December 1, 2020.  Critics widely acclaimed Nate for its provocative performance, regarding it as an innovative break with "Netflix's mainstream comedy brand."

Palamides starred as Buttercup in the 2016 Powerpuff Girls animated television series.

She won Best Newcomer at the Edinburgh Comedy Awards in 2017.

Palamides plays the character "Mara" in TV commercials for Progressive Insurance.

She also co-hosts the Disney-themed podcast Hidden Mickeys alongside Carrie Poppy.

Filmography

References

External links
 

1990 births
Living people
21st-century American comedians
21st-century American women writers
21st-century American writers
American sketch comedians
American television actresses
American voice actresses
American women comedians
Place of birth missing (living people)